Brooklyn is a village in Jackson County in the U.S. state of Michigan.  The population was 1,206 at the 2010 census. It is located in the Irish Hills region of southern Michigan, just north of U.S. Route 12 along M-50.  The village is located within Columbia Township.

The village is well known for its proximity to Michigan International Speedway, which is just south in Cambridge Township.

History

The village was founded by Calvin Swain, who filed the first land claim on June 16, 1832 and named his settlement Swainsville. In a town meeting vote on August 5, 1836, the community elected to change the town's name to Brooklyn. The town is named after Brooklyn, New York.

A sign marking Swain's historical discovery currently stands in the town square.

The area was primarily a summer vacation spot for residents of metropolitan Detroit who owned cottages near lakes in the area. With the nearby additions of Interstate 94 in the late 1950s and Michigan International Speedway in the late 1960s, Brooklyn established a year-round population.

Geography

Brooklyn is located in a portion of central lower Michigan known for its lush, rolling green landscapes in the Irish Hills area of Southeast Michigan, which contains scenic lakes surrounding Hayes State Park, Watkins Lake State Park and County Preserve, and Cambridge Junction Historic State Park.

Demographics

2010 census
As of the census of 2010, there were 1,206 people, 577 households, and 306 families living in the village. The racial makeup of the village was 96.9% White, 0.2% African American, 0.7% Native American, 1.3% Asian, and 0.8% from two or more races. Hispanic or Latino of any race were 2.9% of the population.

There were 577 households, of which 27.0% had children under the age of 18 living with them, 34.7% were married couples living together, 13.5% had a female householder with no husband present, 4.9% had a male householder with no wife present, and 47.0% were non-families. 41.6% of all households were made up of individuals, and 22.6% had someone living alone who was 65 years of age or older. The average household size was 2.09 and the average family size was 2.86.

The median age in the village was 43.6 years. 22.7% of residents were under the age of 18; 7.7% were between the ages of 18 and 24; 21.8% were from 25 to 44; 24.9% were from 45 to 64; and 23% were 65 years of age or older. The gender makeup of the village was 43.4% male and 56.6% female.

2000 census
As of the census of 2000, there were 1,176 people, 507 households, and 297 families living in the village. The racial makeup of the village was 97.96% White, 0.26% Native American, 0.51% Asian, 0.51% from other races, and 0.77% from two or more races. Hispanic or Latino of any race were 1.96% of the population.

There were 507 households, out of which 27.8% had children under the age of 18 living with them, 41.8% were married couples living together, 12.4% had a female householder with no husband present, and 41.4% were non-families. 35.9% of all households were made up of individuals, and 18.1% had someone living alone who was 65 years of age or older.  The average household size was 2.22 and the average family size was 2.87.

In the village, the population was spread out, with 23.5% under the age of 18, 7.2% from 18 to 24, 27.8% from 25 to 44, 19.6% from 45 to 64, and 21.9% who were 65 years of age or older.  The median age was 40 years. For every 100 females there were 81.8 males.  For every 100 females age 18 and over, there were 74.1 males.

The median income for a household in the village was $31,964, and the median income for a family was $48,750. Males had a median income of $32,727 versus $22,083 for females. The per capita income for the village was $18,933.  About 9.7% of families and 12.1% of the population were below the poverty line, including 25.1% of those under age 18 and 12.1% of those age 65 or over.

Notable people

 Ethlyn T. Clough (1858–1936), American newspaper publisher, editor
 Vivian Kellogg, first baseman in the All-American Girls Professional Baseball League; lived in Brooklyn; the Vivian Kellogg Field was dedicated at the Columbia Little League complex.

References

External links

Village of Brooklyn government site
Brooklyn and Irish Hills Chamber of Commerce
The Brooklyn Exponent newspaper

Villages in Jackson County, Michigan
Villages in Michigan
Populated places established in 1832
1832 establishments in Michigan Territory